4bia, or Phobia (lit. 'Crossroads') is a 2008 Thai horror anthology film directed by Youngyooth Thongkonthun, Banjong Pisanthanakun, Parkpoom Wongpoom, and Paween Purijitpanya.

Plot
Loneliness (Thai title - เหงา, Ngao; directed by Youngyooth Thongkonthun)
Pin, a young woman stuck in her apartment due to the cast on her leg, communicates with the outside world via cell phone and text messages. She complains to her boyfriend, Puak, who went on a camping trip in Chiang Mai, that she feels so lonely. Every night, Pin exchanges text messages with a stranger, who asks to befriend her and seems friendly enough. The stranger says that he is in somewhere "cramped" for 100 days and is oddly only able to be contacted at night. After sending the mysterious stranger her photo, Pin asks for one in return and is sent the same photo. When she questions him, he says he is in the picture next to her. A ghostly face is slightly visible next to Pin's smiling face. As she researches recent deaths, Pin discovers that the son of Princess Sophia of Virnistan died and was buried with a cellphone so he can communicate with his mother or connect to someone else whenever he feels lonely. Pin then gets a text from the stranger, saying that he will come to her place now. All of the lights begin to go out and Pin cries in fear. She is then assaulted by the ghost and is thrown out of the window to her death. A scene from the past shows the prince receiving a text message from his girlfriend ending the relationship which causes him to commit suicide by walking in front of a taxi cab causing an accident, the same accident that was the cause of Pin's broken leg as she was inside the cab.

Deadly Charm (Thai title - ยันต์สั่งตาย, Yan Sang Tai; directed by Paween Purikitpanya)
A nerdy student named Ngid sees his school friends take some drugs, and he is beaten to death. One of the gang's member, Pink, is worried but fails to stop her friends from bullying Ngid. Unfortunately, when he is beaten, he curses his friends on a deadly charm, which requires a photo of a dead person with his/her eyes open. Things get worse when everything keeps moving by itself when ordered by Ngid's soul, and one by one the drug addicts start dying. Even though Pink did not beat him, Ngid's soul decides not to spare her too, because she had seen it all yet had not do anything to help him. In the end, a police officer comes by to warn her not to go outside, and is shocked to see Pink laughing after having gouged her own eyes; because the curse requires the victim to see Ngid, he cannot harm her anymore now that she has gotten rid of her ability to see. It is revealed that the person in the photo Ngid used to practice the charm is Pin, the disabled young woman in the first story who died with her eyes open.

The Man In The Middle (Thai title - คนกลาง, Khon Klang; directed by Banjong Pisanthanakun)
Four friends, Aey, Ter, Shin, and Phuak, go river rafting in a lonely jungle in Chiang Mai. That night while camping, Aey tells his friends that if he were to die, the person who sleeps in the middle will be the next to die along with him. The next day, as the four friends negotiate the river rapids, Aey is thrown from the raft and cannot be located. After many hours of searching, the three remaining friends give up and decide to stay and camp overnight. Shaken by Aey's death tale, the three friends fight over who has to sleep in the middle, eventually coming to an arrangement where none of them need to. Later that night, Aey arrives at the camp and enters the tent, but ongoing strange events make his friends suspicious. Ter, Shin and Phuak leave the tent for a "smoke" and Shin then finds Aey's body. Horrified, Ter, Shin and Phuak run into the woods where they are shocked to find their own dead bodies floating in the river. It is revealed that all four had drowned when the raft tipped over in the rapids, but only Aey accepted his death, while the rest continued to ignore the fact that they had died. In the end, the four friends bond together as spirits.Flight 244 (Thai title - เที่ยวบิน 224, Thiao Bin 244; directed by Parkpoom Wongpoon)
Flight attendant Pim is secretly having an affair with Prince Albert of Virnistan. One day she is ordered to go aboard an airliner on a charter flight for Princess Sophia, the wife of the Prince. Her fellow stewardess, Tui, is unable to attend the flight as her brother Ter (from the previous story) had been found drowned in Chiang Mai. What was supposed to be an ordinary flight turns into something tragic when the princess forms an allergic reaction to Pim's lunch as it contains shrimp to which the princess is allergic to. After the royal house of Virnistan requests that her corpse be sent back immediately for cremation, Pim is required to remain on the plane and escort the body - the only passenger - for the return flight. As the Princess tries to get out of her shroud, Pim's worst nightmare begins. When the plane lands, Pim's body is found lying on the floor, under the feet of the intact enshrouded corpse of Princess Sophia.

Cast

Release
The film premiered on 25 April 2008 and was part on 20 October 2008 at the Toronto After Dark Film Festival, the European premiere was on 23 January 2009 as part of the International Film Festival Rotterdam. In the UK will release as direct-to-video production on 10 May 2010.

SequelPhobia 2'' was released in 2009.

References

External links
 Official site

2008 films
Thai-language films
Thai horror films
2008 horror films
GMM Tai Hub films
2000s mystery films
2008 thriller drama films
2008 drama films
Thai supernatural horror films
Thai horror anthology films